Lerch is a surname. Notable people with the surname include:

Augie Lerch (born 1996), American racing driver
Christian Lerch (born 1978), German journalist
Ernst Lerch (1914–1997), German SS officer
Fred Louis Lerch (1902–1985), Austrian actor
Fredi Lerch (born 1954), Swiss journalist
Georg August Lerch (1792–1857), German architect and politician
Jiří Lerch (born 1971), Czech footballer
Marilyn Lerch (born 1936), American-Canadian poet and activist
Mathias Lerch (1860–1922), Czech mathematician
Randy Lerch (born 1954), American baseball player
Reinhard Lerch, German engineer
Stephan Lerch (born 1984), German football coach

See also 
Gustov C. Lerch House
Lerch Bates
Lerch zeta function
Lorch (disambiguation)

German-language surnames